Joshua Ely House is a historic home located at New Hope, Bucks County, Pennsylvania. The house consists of two sections; one built in the late-18th century and the second in the mid-19th century.  Both sections are  stories tall and constructed of fieldstone. It was occupied by a restaurant, La Bonne Auberge, from 1972 to 2009.

It was added to the National Register of Historic Places in 1985.

References

External links 
 La Bonne Auberge (now closed).

Houses on the National Register of Historic Places in Pennsylvania
Houses in Bucks County, Pennsylvania
National Register of Historic Places in Bucks County, Pennsylvania